The 2001-02 AFC Bournemouth season saw the club relegated from the English Second Division. During the 2001–02 English football season, Bournemouth participated in Division Two, the LDV Vans Trophy, the FA Cup, and the Football League Cup. Bournemouth finished 21st in Division Two and were subsequently relegated to Division Three. They reached the Second Round of the FA Cup, but were knocked of the League Cup and the LDV Vans Trophy at the first hurdle.

2001 also marked the opening of a new look Dean Court, known for sponsorship reasons as 'The Fitness First Stadium', but the first 8 games of the season were held at Dorchester Town's Avenue Stadium while building work was being completed. The first game at The Fitness First Stadium was against Wrexham with the Cherries winning 3–0.

Season squad

Left club during season

 on 28 March 2002

Final league table

Competitions

Legend

Second Division

Results

League Cup

FA Cup

Football League Trophy

References 

A.F.C. Bournemouth
AFC Bournemouth seasons
English football clubs 2001–02 season